Île de Térénez is a French islet inside the last bend of the river Aulne, on the territory of the commune of  Rosnoën. Its highest point is 18m.
Covered in woods, it is accessible by dry land at low tide and faces the Landévennec ship graveyard and Landévennec Abbey. The corniche de Térénez, running along the right bank of the Aulne for 4 kilometres, leads to the pont de Térénez, located 2.5 km further upstream. The island has several locations where recreational boaters may anchor their vessels.

References

Terenez
Landforms of Finistère